The Shire of Cardwell was a local government area of Queensland. It was located on the Coral Sea coast about halfway between the cities of Cairns and Townsville.

The shire also had responsibility for some Great Barrier Reef islands, including Dunk Island, Goold Island and Hinchinbrook Island.

The area's economy is based on agriculture, in particular sugar and bananas, and tourism.  Part of the Wet Tropics of Queensland and Great Barrier Reef World Heritage Sites are located in Cardwell Shire.

History

The Hinchinbrook Division was created on 11 November 1879 as one of 74 divisions around Queensland under the Divisional Boards Act 1879. On 18 January 1884, part of the Hinchinbrook Division was separated to create the new Cardwell Division.

In 1892, the Cardwell Divisional Board built the Cardwell Divisional Board Hall (now heritage-listed) at 51 Victoria Street, Cardwell. At that time, Cardwell was regarded as the major town in the division (as reflected in the division's name).

With the passage of the Local Authorities Act 1902, Cardwell Division became the Shire of Cardwell on 31 March 1903. The divisional board hall then became known as the Cardwell Shire Council Chambers.

To commemorate those who served in World War I, an honour board was erected in the Cardwell Shire Council Chambers in 1922. Composed of marble, it lists 26 servicemen and 2 nurses from the local community. The inclusion of nurses is such a memorial is relatively uncommon.

In 1929, the decision was taken to relocate the shire council's headquarters to the newer but more populous town of Tully. The first council meeting held in Tully was on 27 June 1929. A new shire chambers was built in 1930 on the south-east corner of Bryant and Morris Streets in Tully. The former shire chambers in Cardwell was then used by the Queensland Country Women's Association (QCWA) and later by the Returned Sailors' Soldiers' and Airmen's Imperial League of Australia (RSSAILA). From 1989 to 2008, the building was used as a library. Later it became the J. C. Hubinger Memorial Museum. The presence of the honour board means that the building has been the community focus for Anzac Day ceremonies throughout the years. Given its historical and cultural significance, the building was listed on the Queensland Heritage Register on 21 March 2013.

In 1978, the shire chambers in Tully were replaced with the present council chambers.

On 15 March 2008, under the Local Government (Reform Implementation) Act 2007 passed by the Parliament of Queensland on 10 August 2007, the Shire of Cardwell merged with the Shire of Johnstone (also formerly part of the Hinchinbrook Division) to form the Cassowary Coast Region.

Towns and localities
The Shire of Cardwell included the following settlements:

Greater Tully area:
 Tully
 Birkalla
 Silky Oak

Localities:
 Cardwell
 Bilyana
 Bulgun
 Cardstone
 Carmoo
 Coquette Point
 Damper Creek
 Djiru
 Ellerbeck
 Euramo
 Feluga
 Hull Heads
 Jarra Creek
 Jumbun
 Kennedy
 Lower Tully
 Merryburn
 Midgenoo
 Murray Upper
 Murrigal
 Rockingham
 South Mission Beach
 Tully Heads
 Wongaling Beach

Population

Chairmen
 1884: James Thorn Senior
 1902: Peter Smith
 1903—1904: Johann Christian Hubinger (chairman 15 times)
 1908: Johann Christian Hubinger (again, but died September 1908)
 1909: Mr Hubinger
 1910: Mr Kennedy
 1914: Mr Stamp
 1915: Arthur Henry
 1921—1924: Brice Henry
 1924—1931: James Thorn
 1931—1933: Julius August Winter
 1933—1936: Chris Teitzel
 1936—1940: Brice Henry (died February 1940)
 1940: P. White
 1943—1954: Charles Dickinson
 1985—1991: Atte Raccanello (first and only female council leader)
 2004—2008:  Giuseppe (Joe) Galeano

Gladys Henry was the first female council member, serving between 1976 and 1982.

References

Further reading

External links
 University of Queensland: Queensland Places: Cardwell Shire

Former local government areas of Queensland
Far North Queensland
2008 disestablishments in Australia
Populated places disestablished in 2008